Vicenç may refer to:

People:
Josep Vicenç Foix (1893–1987), Catalan poet, writer, and essayist
Vicenç Cuyàs (1816–1839), Catalan opera composer known for the first Catalan romantic opera La fattucchiera
Vicenç Vilarrubla (born 1981), Catalan Spanish cross-country skier from Bellestar (Alt Urgell)

Places:
Cala Sant Vicenç, Majorca, small resort town in north-eastern Majorca, Spain
Sant Vicenç de Castellet, municipality in the comarca of the Bages in Catalonia, Spain
Sant Vicenç de Montalt, municipality in the comarca of the Maresme in Catalonia, Spain
Sant Vicenç de Torelló, municipality in the comarca of Osona in Catalonia, Spain
Sant Vicenç dels Horts, municipality in the comarca of the Baix Llobregat in Catalonia

Other:
Church of Sant Vicenç, Catalan-Lombard style church in Cardona, Catalonia, Spain